Rizz may refer to:

 Ralph Tresvant, an American singer nicknamed "Rizz"
 Captain Rizz, a London-based musician and community organizer
 Rizz (slang), 2021 slang term for courtship/seduction skills

See also 

